Romer Carl "Reddy" Grey (April 8, 1875 – November 9, 1934) was a professional baseball player. He played one game in Major League Baseball in 1903 for the Pittsburgh Pirates.

Baseball career 
Grey began his baseball career in 1895 with the Jackson Jaxons of the Michigan State League. Overall, he played nine seasons professionally. In his final season, 1903, he was playing for the Worcester Riddlers of the Eastern League when the Pirates acquired him on loan on May 28. He played left field for the Pirates in that day's game, got one hit and one walk in four plate appearances (for a career on-base percentage of .500), then returned to Worcester.

Reddy's brother was famed author Zane Grey, who also played minor league baseball. The two were teammates on both the Jaxons and Findlay Sluggers of the Interstate League in 1895.

Fishing & Writing career 
R C Grey was also a well known fisherman, like his more famous brother, and held several record catches as described in his book, including a world record Broadbill of 588 lbs. He was the author of a book called "Adventures of a Deep-Sea Angler", published in 1930. There are later re-prints. Zane Grey himself in his own fishing books often refers to his brother, usually as "R.C." Reddy often accompanied his brother on the later's world-wide fishing expeditions.

Sources

Major League Baseball outfielders
Pittsburgh Pirates players
Jackson Jaxons players
Findlay Sluggers players
Fort Wayne Farmers players
Toronto Canucks players
Toronto Maple Leafs (International League) players
Rochester Bronchos players
Buffalo Bisons (minor league) players
Montreal Royals players
Worcester Riddlers players
Baseball players from Ohio
Writers from Ohio
Sportspeople from Zanesville, Ohio
Angling writers
1875 births
1934 deaths